Theodorus Daniel Maree (born ) is a South African rugby union player for the  in Super Rugby and the  in the Rugby Challenge. His regular position is scrum-half.

References

South African rugby union players
Living people
1995 births
People from Tzaneen
Rugby union scrum-halves
Blue Bulls players
Pumas (Currie Cup) players
Southern Kings players
Griquas (rugby union) players
Rugby union players from Limpopo